Mikołaj is the Polish cognate of given name Nicholas, used both as a given name and a surname. It may refer to people:

In Polish (or Polish-Lithuanian) nobility:
 Mikołaj Firlej (died 1526), Polish nobleman, Hetman, diplomat, and expert of south-east Europe
 Mikołaj Kamieniecki, Polish nobleman and the first Grand Hetman of the Crown
 Mikołaj Krzysztof "the Orphan" Radziwiłł, Polish-Lithuanian lord
 Mikołaj Mielecki, Polish nobleman and politician
 Mikołaj Ostroróg, Polish nobleman
 Mikołaj Potocki, member of the Polish nobility, magnate, and the Field Hetman of the Crown
 Mikołaj "the Black" Radziwiłł, noble of the Grand Duchy of Lithuania, Palatine of Vilnius, and Grand Chancellor of Lithuania
 Mikołaj "the Red" Radziwiłł, Polish-Lithuanian lord, Palatine of Vilnius, Grand Chancellor, and Grand Hetman of Lithuania
 Mikołaj VII Radziwiłł, Polish-Lithuanian lord, and Lord Grand Chamberlain of Lithuania
 Mikołaj Sienicki, notable member of the landed nobility of the Kingdom of Poland
 Mikołaj Szyszkowski, bishop of Warmia from 1633 until his death in 1643
 Mikołaj Zebrzydowski, Palatine of Lublin, Grand Marshal of the Crown, and Palatine of Kraków

In Polish music:

 Aga Mikolaj (1971–2021), stage name of Agnieszka Beata Mikołajczyk, a Polish operatic soprano
 Mikołaj Gomółka, Polish composer
 Mikołaj Radomski, Polish composer
 Mikołaj Zieleński, Polish composer

In Polish literature:

 Mikołaj Hussowski, Belarusian and Polish Renaissance writer
 Mikołaj Rej, one of the best known Polish poets and writers of the Renaissance

In Cinema : 

 Mikołaj Kopeć, Polish director based in France. Co-creator of production house Têtes Parlantes.

In other fields:

Mikołaj Kopernik, usually translated as Nicolaus Copernicus, Renaissance mathematician and astronomer, known for formulating heliocentrism
Mikołaj Kubica (1945–2020), Polish gymnast
Mikołaj Sieniawski, notable Polish magnate, military commander, and prominent politician
Mikołaj Trąba, Polish Roman Catholic priest, Royal Notary, Vice-Chancellor of the Crown, bishop of Halicz, and archbishop of Gniezno

Polish masculine given names